Felipe Moreira is a given name. It may refer to:

 Felipe Moreira (footballer, born 1981), Brazilian football manager and former midfielder
 Felipe Moreira (footballer, born 1988), Brazilian football forward